WDTC1 ("Adipose") is a gene associated with obesity.

WDTC1 is a gene that codes for a protein acting as a suppressor in lipid accumulation. WDTC1 protein consists of seven WD40 domains, three transient receptor potential channel protein-protein interaction domains, DDB1 binding elements, and a prenylated C-terminus. Reduced expression or disruption of WDTC1 gene is associated with obesity, increased triglyceride accumulation, and adipogenesis. WDTC1 is a factor in a complex composed of DDB1, CUL4, and ROC1 that restricts transcription in adipogenesis.

Model organisms 

Model organisms have been used in the study of WDTC1 function. A conditional knockout mouse line called Wdtc1tm1a(KOMP)Wtsi was generated at the Wellcome Trust Sanger Institute. Male and female animals underwent a standardized phenotypic screen to determine the effects of deletion. Additional screens performed:  - In-depth immunological phenotyping

Studies of phenotype of mice showed that having a loss of an allele resulted in obesity and poor metabolic profiles. Transgenic expression of the WDTC1 gene in mice showed the opposite effect with mice having less adipose.

References

External links 
  Born lucky: Scientists discover "skinny gene" - MSNBC